George Martius MacDermott (28 April 1863 – 30 March 1939) was an Anglican priest in the late 19th and early 20th centuries.

MacDermott was educated at Durham University, where he matriculated as a member of Hatfield Hall and was ordained in 1889. He continued his studies at Durham, going on to earn a Bachelor of Arts degree in 1891. 

After curacies in Hyde, Slaugham, Banham and Hilgay he was rector of Eccles from 1900 to 1906. He was Vicar of North Walsham with Antingham from 1906 to 1909; rector of Little Ellingham with Great Ellingham from 1909 to 1921; archdeacon of Norfolk from 1918 to 1920; rector of Ashby Oby with Thurne from 1921 to 1928; archdeacon of Norwich from 1921 to 1938 and Rector of St Michael-at-Plea, Norwich with St Peter Hungate.

Notes

1863 births
1939 deaths
19th-century English Anglican priests
20th-century English Anglican priests
People educated at Haberdashers' Boys' School
Archdeacons of Norwich
Alumni of Hatfield College, Durham
People from Breckland District